The Thai records in swimming are the fastest ever performances of swimmers from Thailand, which are recognised and ratified by the Thailand Swimming Association (TASA).

All records were set in finals unless noted otherwise.

Long Course (50 m)

Men

Women

Mixed relay

Short Course (25 m)

Men

Women

Mixed relay

Notes

References
General
Thai Records 10 January 2023 updated
Specific

External links
TASA web site

Thailand
Swimming in Thailand
Swimming
Swimming